Underbelly: The Golden Mile, the third series of Nine Network's crime drama series Underbelly, originally aired from 11 April to 27 June 2010.  It is a thirteen-part series loosely based on real events that stemmed from the mile-long nightclub/red light district in the Sydney suburb of Kings Cross, also known as the "Golden Mile", between 1988 and 1999.  It primarily depicts the organized crimes in Kings Cross and the police corruption leading up to the 1995 Wood Royal Commission.  It is a prequel to Underbelly, which was about the Melbourne gangland killings, and a sequel to Underbelly: A Tale of Two Cities.  Among the characters presented are John Ibrahim, Kim Hollingsworth, George Freeman, Lenny McPherson and MP John Hatton.  Some of the characters, particularly those of the NSW Police, reprise their roles from A Tale of Two Cities.

The series premiered on the Nine Network on 11 April 2010 at 8.30 pm, with the double episode premiere attracting an average of 2.23 million viewers nationally, in the mainland capitals. The series also premiered on TV3 in New Zealand on Wednesday 5 May 2010 at 8:30 pm.

Synopsis 
The series begins in 1988, a year after the events of the previous series.  An intelligent but rebellious Lebanese high school boy named John Ibrahim joins his friends in Kings Cross with plans and dreams of making a fortune.  Throughout the series the plot shows how John began his entrepreneurship by working for underworld figures like George Freeman and Lenny McPherson, who at the time were the ultimate kings of the Cross.  The series also shows the corruption within NSW Police ranks stationed in Kings Cross, particularly Trevor Haken, Jim Egan and Dennis Kelly, who reprise their roles from Season 2 and Graham "Chook" Fowler, Eddie "Parrot" Gould and Neville "Scully" Scullion.

George Freeman dies from an asthma attack, leaving the Cross up for grabs by anyone with power on the street.  A young woman named Kim Hollingsworth appears and the series explains Kim's story from being an ordinary working girl to a high-end stripper/prostitute.  In the center of the series, social justice crusader and NSW MP John Hatton initiates the Wood Royal Commission to investigate corrupt police officers.  Police detective Trevor Haken becomes an informant during the Commission, helping the government expose corrupt officers in Kings Cross, while his family life is torn apart.  The other detectives are caught and Jim Egan commits suicide.  In Kings Cross, John Ibrahim has become a notable businessman after acquisition of most entertainment complexes in the area and being acquitted of a manslaughter charge.  The dominance of traditional players in the Cross like Bill and Louis is now under threat from the arrival of a stable of new characters, including drug dealer Benny Kassab and his violent and impulsive enforcer Danny "DK" Karam.

Kim Hollingsworth decides to apply for the police academy after growing sick of her life as a sex worker.  She is approached by the Royal Commission task force and becomes an undercover agent but her application for the police workforce is rejected after her previous employment history is revealed and the Royal Commission abandons her after it has used her.  She decides to sue the NSW Police and wins the lawsuit, though she never receives any compensation.  Near the end of the series, Dennis Kelly applies to become Police Commissioner but is forced to withdraw after his corrupted past is exposed.  Since the Royal Commission, the Golden Mile has plunged into chaos and violence with turf wars breaking out.  A special task force called Strike Force Lancer is set up to investigate organized crimes in Kings Cross.  After Kassab's arrest, Danny Karam has formed a gang called "DK's Boys" in attempt to take over the Cross but his gang members, led by the loose cannon Michael Kanaan, plot his murder and attempt to take control; their violence escalates with kneecappings of rivals to an eventual shooting of civilians.  Task Force Lance eventually pin down Kanaan and arrest his gang. The series ends showing that Kim is living a quiet life life in rural New South Wales, while peace has finally been restored to Kings Cross.  The police and bikies said to John that they will always watch his back, making him remain as the undisputed king of the Cross.

Episodes

Cast

Main cast 
 Emma Booth as Kim Hollingsworth, former prostitute, student police officer and undercover police agent.
 Dieter Brummer as Trevor Haken, corrupt Kings Cross detective.
 Firass Dirani as John Ibrahim, Kings Cross nightclub owner and eventual King of the Cross.
 Cheree Cassidy as Debbie Webb, Kings Cross detective and whistleblower.
 Wil Traval as Joe Dooley, Kings Cross police officer.
 Daniel Roberts as James "Jimbo" Egan, corrupt Kings Cross detective.
 Damien Garvey as Graham "Chook" Fowler, corrupt head of the Kings Cross detectives.
 Paul Tassone as Dennis Kelly, corrupt Chief Inspector.

Recurring cast 
 Diarmid Heidenreich as Eddie "Parrot" Gould, aggressive super-corrupt Kings Cross detective.
 Rob Carlton as Neville 'Scully' Scullion, shy and docile Kings Cross detective.
 Peter O'Brien as George Freeman, illegal bookmaker, Ibrahim's mentor, and King of the Cross.
 John McNeill as Lenny McPherson, arms dealer and organized crime leader.
 Salvatore Coco as Harry 'Hammer' Hammoud, Kings Cross stand-over man and associate of Ibrahim. It is argued that this character is really Sam Ibrahim, John's brother.
 Michael Vice as Benny Kassab, Kings Cross drug dealer. Albeit the name is different, this character is based on a Kings Cross drug dealer named Robert Daher.
 Hazem Shammas as Bill Bayeh, King of the Cross and drug kingpin.
 Steve Bastoni as Louis Bayeh, racketeer from Parramatta.
 Dan Mor as Danny "DK" Karam, Kings Cross stand-over man, drug dealer and gang leader.
 Ryan Corr as Michael "Doc" Kanaan, DK's Lieutenant and member of DK's boys.
 Sigrid Thornton as Geraldine "Gerry" Lloyd, Royal Commission investigator.
 Caroline Craig is the series narrator, reprising her role from the first two series.

Guest cast 

 Ronny Mouawad as Norm Korbage, Kassab's associate and drug addict.
 Matuse as Shaka, Kassab's associate and drug dealer.
 Jason Ghama as Ali Ghazzawie, Kings Cross drug dealer.
 Peter Phillips-Vass as Benny Puta, Kings Cross drug dealer.
 John Seru as Kiwi Steve, Ibrahim's bodyguard.
 George Koutros as Russel "Bubblehead" Townsend, Ibrahim's associate.
 Waddah Sari as Buddy, John Ibrahim's friend and associate.
 Michael Gittany as Charlie Fish, John Ibrahim's associate.
 Sabeena Manalis as Natalie (1 episode), John Ibrahim's love interest.
 Ben Wood as "Bad Don" Denucci, Manager and part owner of the Budget hotel with DK.
 Rahel Abdulrahman as Talal Assad (1 episode), Kings Cross drug dealer.
 Sophie Hensser as Monica, Waitress and Benny Kassab's girlfriend.
 Natasha Leigh as Melissa Hollingsworth, Kim Hollingsworth's sister and part-time prostitute.
 Lieschen Pogue as Galina, Kim Hollingsworth's friend and fellow prostitute.
 Sarah Jane Coombe as Krystal (1 episode), a prostitute.
 Kelly Atkinson as Belinda (1 episode), A friend of Kim and prostitute.
 Mitch Bartlett as Wanda, Transvestite prostitute.
 Mark Furze as Trent, Kim Hollingsworth's boyfriend.
 Andrew Hazzard as Michael, Kim Hollingsworth's boyfriend and stalker.
 Georgina Haig as Georgina Freeman, George Freeman's wife.
 Lesley Hancock as Dawn, Madame of the brothel Kim works at.
 Russell Kiefel as Mel Mal, Owner of the Tunnel Nightclub which Ibrahim buys into.
 Rebecca Lee Slade as Michelle (1 episode), Classmate and Ibrahim's one time lover.
 Hanna Griffiths as Jodie, Adam Andrews' girlfriend.
 Hugo Johnstone-Burt as Adam Andrews, Kanaan's best friend and a member of DK's boys.
 Anthony Di Placido as Rabeeh "Rabs" Mawas, member of DK's boys.
 Jey Osman as Wassim "Wassi" El Assaad, member of DK's boys.
 Dina Panozzo as Samira Kanaan, Michael Kanaan's mother.

 Natalie Bassingthwaighte as Maria Haken, Trevor Haken's wife.
 Tom O'Sullivan as Sean "Grunter" Sinclair, corrupt Kings Cross detective, who turns straight.
 Andrew Bibby as Greg Locke, Fraud Squad detective and Debbie Webb's husband.
 Jessica Tovey as Wendy Jones (2 episodes), Ibrahim's love interest and police officer.
 Megan Drury as Claudia Campanelli, King's Cross detective and sexual assault victim.
 Matt Day as Inspector Sid Hillier, police investigator who leads Strike Force Lancer.
 Toby Leonard Moore as Sergeant Dave, Kings Cross police officer and Kim Hollingsworth's lover.
 Wayne Pygram as the Commissioner of the NSW police force.
 John Waters as MP John Hatton (2 episodes), politician.
 Ian Smith as Ken Wallis (3 episodes), Influential NSW politician
 Sean Taylor as James Wood, Presiding Justice over the Royal Commission.
 James Evans as Ralph Griffin, Kim's handler from the Royal Commission.
 Brandon Burke as Bruce Onley, Royal Commission investigator.
 Paul Barry as John Agius, Barrister for the Royal Commission.
 Alan Cinis as Andy Little, corrupt Fraud Squad detective.
 Christopher Truswell as Bobby Flood, corrupt Fraud Squad detective.
 Peter Scarf as Constable Andrew, Kings Cross police officer.
 Michael Whittington as Constable Pickles, Kings Cross police officer.
 Stuart McRae as Les Leopold, Kings Cross police officer.
 Anthony Gooley as Marty Ludlow (1 episode), Trevor Haken's informant.
 Anthony Burke as Mick Drury (1 episode), NSW detective and whistleblower.
 Lynette Curran as Irene Webb, Debbie Webb's mother.
 Aziz Shavershian as man on the bar sitting near the door
 Daryl Lee as John Webb, Debbie Webb's father.
 Megan Miller-McConochie as Mrs Gould, Eddie Gould's wife.
 Melissa McCole-Brooks as Mrs Sinclair, Sean Sinclair's wife.
 Sandra Galvin as Fran Egan, Jim Egan's wife.
 Matilda Brown as Ellie Dooley, Joe Dooley's wife.
 Liam Macdonald as Constable Tim Dewey, Kings Cross police officer.

Ratings

Legal issues 
In March 2010, former King's Cross policewoman Wendy Hatfield lodged an application in the New South Wales Supreme Court, asking to view five episodes of the series featuring a character supposedly based on her, Wendy Jones, to see if she had been defamed. Her concern was that the series, which was based on a book of the same name she believed that defamed her, would also defame her by implying she had a sexual relationship with John Ibrahim. However, her request was denied, with a judge ruling she would only have grounds to lodge defamation proceedings after the fact.

On 25 May 2010, Hatfield lodged a defamation lawsuit with the NSW Supreme Court against the Nine Network, TCN Nine Network Sydney and the producers, Screentime. She believed that she was defamed in episode 6, "Women in Uniform", arguing that the depiction of the character of Wendy Jones, which is allegedly based on her, engaged in an affair with Ibrahim had defamed her and caused her "to be bought into hatred, ridicule and contempt" and "gravely injured her character". The case was to be heard on 22 June.

On 21 December 2010 Hatfield succeeded in a defamation suit against the publishers of Underbelly: The Golden Mile, the tie-in book to the series, being awarded $59,000 in damages.

References

External links 
 
 

2010 Australian television series debuts
2010 Australian television series endings
2010 Australian television seasons
APRA Award winners
2010s Australian crime television series
2010s Australian drama television series
2010s Australian television miniseries
Nine Network original programming
Television series set in the 1980s
Television series set in the 1990s
Television shows set in New South Wales
Kings Cross, New South Wales
Organised crime in Sydney